A mother is a female parent.

Mother  may also refer to:

Literature
 "Mother" (short story), a 1907 short story by Owen Wister
 Mother (novel), 1906 novel by Maxim Gorky
 "A Mother", a 1914 short story by James Joyce

Theatre
 Mother (opera), a 1929 opera by the Czech composer Alois Hába
 Mother, a 1938 opera by Valery Zhelobinsky
 Mother, opera by Tikhon Khrennikov
 Mother (play), a 1910 play by Jules Eckert Goodman

Film

United States
 Mother (1910 film), an American silent film by the Thanhouser Company
 Mother (1914 film), an American silent film by Maurice Tourneur
Mother, a 1927 American silent film written by Charles Kerr
 Mother (1996 film), an American film by Albert Brooks
Mother, a 2006 short film by Sian Heder
 mother!, a 2017 American film by Darren Aronofsky
 Mother, a computer in Alien (1979)

Europe
 Mother (1926 film), a Russian film by Vsevolod Pudovkin
 Mother (1937 film), a Hungarian film by Johann von Vásáry
 Mother (1955 film), a Soviet film by Mark Donskoy
 Mother (1990 film), a Soviet film by Gleb Panfilov
 Mother (2016 Georgian film), a short film directed by Rati Tsiteladze
 Mother (2016 Estonian film), an Estonian film
 Mother (2017 Spanish film), a short film by Rodrigo Sorogoyen
 Mother (2019 Spanish film), a film by Rodrigo Sorogoyen based on his short film of the same name

Asia
Mother, a 1935 Chinese film by Wen Yimin
Mother, a 1949 Chinese film by Shi Hui (director)
 Mother (1952 film), a Japanese film by Mikio Naruse
Mother, a 1956 Chinese film by Ling Zifeng
 Mother (1963 film), a Japanese film by Kaneto Shindo
 Mother (1985 film), a Korean film by Park Chul-soo
 Ibunda, a 1986 Indonesian film by Teguh Karya, released internationally as Mother
 Mother (1991 film), an Iranian film by Ali Hatami
 Mother (1999 film), an Indian film starring Rekha
 Mother (2009 film), a South Korean film by Bong Joon-ho
 Mother (2014 film), a Japanese film by Kazuo Umezu
 Mother (2020 film), a Japanese film by Tatsushi Ômori

Television

Series
 Mother (Japanese TV series), a 2010 Japanese television drama
Mother (Turkish TV series), a 2016 Turkish television drama
 Mother (South Korean TV series), a 2018 South Korean TV series

Episodes
 "Mother" (Once Upon a Time), a 2015 episode from the TV series Once Upon a Time
 "Mother" (The Flash), an episode from the TV series The Flash
"Mother", an episode from the sixth season of Fear the Walking Dead
 "Mother...", an episode of Fullmetal Alchemist

Characters
 Mother (The Avengers), a 1960s British TV character

Games
 Mother (video game), a 1989 role-playing video game
 Mother (video game series)

Music

Bands
 Mother Mother, a Canadian rock band formerly called Mother

Albums
 Mother (In This Moment album), 2020
 Mother (Jacky Terrasson and Stéphane Belmondo album), 2016
 Mother (Natalie Maines album), 2013
 Mother (Susumu Yokota album), 2009
 Mother (Kubb album), 2005
 Mother (Luna Sea album), 1994
 Mother (Keiichi Suzuki and Hirokazu Tanaka album), 1989
 Mother (Veil of Maya album), 2023
 Mother, an album by Gilli Smyth

Songs
"Mother" (Axel Hirsoux song), 2014
 "Mother" (Blondie song), 2011
 "Mother" (Charlie Puth song), 2019
 "Mother" (Danzig song), 1988
 "Mother" (John Lennon song), 1970
 "Mother" (Luna Sea song), 1995
 "Mother" (Meghan Trainor song), 2023
 "Mother" (Pink Floyd song), 1979
 "Mother", by the Afro Celt Sound System from Volume 5: Anatomic
 "Mother", by Chicago from Chicago III
 "Mother", by Era from Era
 "Mother", by Cyndi Lauper from Sisters of Avalon
 "Mother", by Florence + the Machine from How Big, How Blue, How Beautiful
 "Mother", by James from Seven
 "Mother", by M-Factor
 "Mother", by Moloko from Things to Make and Do
 "Mother", by The Police from Synchronicity
 "Mother", by Puffy AmiYumi from Mother/Nehorina hahorina
 "Mother", by Ray Charles released as single in 2002
 "Mother", by Red House Painters from Red House Painters
 "Mother", by Tori Amos from Little Earthquakes
 "Mother", from the musical A Chorus Line
 "Mother", by Kacey Musgraves from Golden Hour
 "MOTHER", by Susumu Hirasawa from Technique of Relief
 "M-O-T-H-E-R", by Howard Johnson
"Mother", by Blonde Redhead from Melody of Certain Damaged Lemons
"Mother", by Porter Robinson from Nurture

Food and drink
 Mother (drink)
 Mother's, a kosher food brand owned by The Manischewitz Company
Fermentation starter, sometimes called a "mother", used to start the fermentation process in making various foods and drinks
 "Mother" or "mother dough", a pre-ferment starter dough
Kombucha mother, or SCOBY (for symbiotic colony of bacteria and yeast), occurring in the making of kombucha

Other uses
 Mother (advertising agency), a British advertising agency
 Motherboard, the main printed circuit board found in microcomputers
 Mother, prototype of the British Mark I tank
 (Sometimes spelled "moth-er"), a person who studies moths

See also

 
 
 Ma (disambiguation)
 Mama (disambiguation)
 Mom (disambiguation)
 Mommy (disambiguation)
 Mothers (disambiguation)
 Mum (disambiguation)
 Mummy (disambiguation)
 Mutha (disambiguation)
 The Mother (disambiguation)
 Queen-mother (disambiguation)